George Germain may refer to:
 George Germain, 1st Viscount Sackville, British soldier and politician
 George W. Germain, member of the Michigan House of Representatives